Phor Tay High School (Chinese: 菩提国民型华文中学 ; Malay: Sekolah Menengah Jenis Kebangsaan Phor Tay) or SMJK Phor Tay is a public, Buddhist, co-educational high school, located in Sungai Dua, Penang. It is the only Buddhist secondary school, where Buddhist education is a compulsory subject for all Buddhist students of the school, in Malaysia.

Phor Tay High School was previously an all-girls school. It was officially converted to a co-educational school after its relocation from Jalan Bagan Jermal in 2009.

History
The school is named after Bodhi which means enlightenment in Sanskrit. It is originated from the efforts of a Buddhist nun called Hong Lien who set up the Phor Tay institute as an orphanage in 1936  She came from the province of Xiamen in China to propagate Buddhism in Penang, Malaysia.
After the war, the school was rebuilt with Ong Dong Shu, who had previously taught in Yangon and Makassar becoming the school's first principal until retiring for health reasons in 1958. Philanthropist Aw Boon Haw contributed towards the building.

In 2007, the school began a transition into a co-educational institution through an application to the Ministry of Education and began to raise money to relocate to a new location for this purpose. 
Phor Tay High School has since moved to its present location in Sungai Dua in 2009 due to the demand for a Chinese national-type secondary schools in the south-west district of Penang island.

References

External links 
Website

Secondary schools in Malaysia
Schools in Penang
Chinese-language schools in Malaysia
1935 establishments in British Malaya
Buddhist schools